Wolfram Klein (born 8 September 1968 in Nettetal-Breyell) is a former German footballer.

Klein made 83 appearances in the 2. Fußball-Bundesliga during his playing career.

References

External links 
 

1968 births
Living people
People from Viersen (district)
Sportspeople from Düsseldorf (region)
German footballers
Association football forwards
2. Bundesliga players
Wuppertaler SV players
Rot-Weiss Essen players
Alemannia Aachen players
Fortuna Düsseldorf players
Footballers from North Rhine-Westphalia
SV 19 Straelen players